Lei Jun (born 16 December 1969) is a Chinese billionaire entrepreneur and philanthropist. He is known for founding the consumer electronics company Xiaomi. As of October 2022, Lei Jun's net worth was estimated at either US$8.1 billion according to the Bloomberg Billionaires Index, making him the 203rd richest person in the world, or at $7.5 billion by Forbes, ranking him 265th worldwide.

Biography 
Lei Jun was born on 7 December 1969 in Xiantao, in the underdeveloped countryside of Hubei. Both of his parents were teachers, which was a disgraced profession after the Cultural Revolution; his father made $7 per month. As a child, he was interested in electronics and liked disassembling and re-assembling radios, which was encouraged by his father. He made the first electric lamp in his village using two batteries, a bulb, a self-made wooden box, and some wires.

In 1987, he graduated from Mianyang Middle School (now Xiantao Middle School) and began attending Wuhan University, from where he graduated with a Bachelor of Arts in computer science in 1991. During his last year of college, he founded his first company, Gundugoms. He also studied profusely and excelled at school.

In 1992, Lei joined Kingsoft as an engineer. He became the CEO of the company in 1998 and led it towards an initial public offering on the Hong Kong Stock Exchange in 2007. On 20 December 2007, he resigned as president and CEO of Kingsoft for "health reasons".

In 2000, Lei founded Joyo.com, an online bookstore, which he sold for US$75 million to Amazon.com in 2004.

In 2005, Lei made a $1 million investment in YY; those shares were worth $129 million when the company became a public company via an initial public offering in 2012.

In 2008, he became a chairman of UCWeb.

In 2010, Lei Jun founded Xiaomi, a technology company that manufactures smartphones, mobile apps, and other consumer electronics.

In 2011, he co-founded Shunwei Capital, an investment company, via which he invests in companies in the e-commerce, social networking, and mobile industries.

In 2011, he rejoined Kingsoft as chairman.

In 2013, Lei Jun was appointed a delegate of the National People's Congress.

Awards and recognition
In 2014, Lei was named Businessman of the Year by Forbes.

In 2015, Lei was named to the Time 100.

In 2019, Lei was recognized as an "Outstanding Builder of Socialism with Chinese Characteristics".

Personal life
They have two children. As of 2016, he spoke very little of the English language and spoke to the media via a translator.

Philanthropy
By 2017, Lei had donated $1 billion to charity, starting with a ¥140,000 donation in 1997 to his alma mater, Wuhan University. He later made donations to Zhuhai Charity, an organization that funds schools for migrants, the villagers of Yangchun for the renovation of schools and mudbrick houses anof cultural buildings, the victims of the 2013 Lushan earthquake, and was a participant in the Ice Bucket Challenge to raise funds for amyotrophic lateral sclerosis.

In 2021, he donated over $2.2 billion worth of Xiaomi shares to charity.

References

External links
 Lei Jun's Weibo Page

1969 births
Asia Game Changer Award winners
Businesspeople from Hubei
Chinese billionaires
Chinese technology company founders
Delegates to the 12th National People's Congress
Delegates to the 13th National People's Congress
Living people
People from Xiantao
Wuhan University alumni
Xiaomi people